"Let Her Go" is a song recorded by English singer-songwriter Passenger. It was recorded at Sydney's Linear Recording and co-produced by Mike Rosenberg (a.k.a. Passenger) and Chris Vallejo. The recording features Australian musicians Stu Larsen, Georgia Mooney, Stu Hunter, Cameron Undy, and Glenn Wilson. "Let Her Go" was released on 24 July 2012 as the second single from Passenger's fourth album, All the Little Lights.

The song became a sleeper hit, achieving international success and topping the charts in many countries around the world. As of July 2014, it has sold over one million digital copies in the UK, and over four million in the US. In 2014, the song was nominated for the Brit Award for British Single of the Year, and won Passenger the British Academy's Ivor Novello Award for Most Performed Work.

Background
The lyrics of the song are poetic and melancholic, describing the regrets associated with ending a relationship. The chorus describes situations in which one does not appreciate what he/she has until it is gone, and relates this to love. The verses give detailed scenes involving a heartbroken man dealing with his breakup.

"Let Her Go" is driven by a chorus which is repeated five times throughout the song. The second half of the final chorus is performed a cappella. Including acoustic guitar and vocals from Rosenberg, backing vocals, piano, drums, bass, and strings, the song is instrumentally diverse. The song is performed in the key of G major, played with a capo on the seventh fret of the guitar. Rosenberg's vocals span from D4 to the high note of E5.

Commercial performance

"Let Her Go" was released in July 2012 as the second single from Passenger's third album All the Little Lights. The song became a hit first in the Netherlands after Dave, a Dutch fan, e-mailed Passenger expressing his wish to introduce the song to some Dutch radio stations, claiming it could be a hit there. This resulted in the song trending on Dutch stations and finding enormous commercial success with the Dutch public. The song became a hit first in the Netherlands, reaching number two in the Dutch Top 40 in November 2012 and spending a total of four non-consecutive weeks at that position. The next month that year, it topped at number one.

Since 2013, and after initial success in the Netherlands, "Let Her Go" has reached number one in Australia, Austria, Belgium, Czech Republic, Denmark, Finland, Germany, Greece, Ireland, Israel, Italy, Luxembourg, Mexico, New Zealand, Norway, Slovakia, Sweden and Switzerland, number two in the UK Singles Chart, number five in the US on the Billboard Hot 100 and number one on Billboard Hot Rock Songs, making it his first international success. The song has sold over 1 million digital copies in the UK, and over 4 million in the US as of July 2014. In October 2019, "Let Her Go" surpassed one billion streams on the music service Spotify, one of the most played songs on the service.

Music video
The music video was uploaded on 25 July 2012, directed and produced by the Australian video artist Dave Jensen and Tavic. It shows the stage being prepared for a Passenger concert, with footage of Passenger performance with his backing band and shots of the audience present reacting.

As of September 2022, the video has received over 3.3 billion views on the video-sharing website YouTube, making it the 24th most viewed video of all time on the site.

Track listing

Cover versions

In 2013, Jasmine Thompson released a cover version.

British singer Birdy recorded a cover version called "Let Him Go" in 2013 on BBC Radio 1's Live Lounge.

An unreleased acoustic version of the song was donated to support college radio in the USA on the 2013 College Radio Day Vol. 2 album. The song was limited to being on only the CD version of the album (only 1,500 copies have been pressed).

Italian pianist Costantino Carrara published a piano arrangement of this song on 6 December 2013, that quickly became the most popular Let Her Go piano cover with more than 20 million views.

In August 2014, Glen Templeton made a country cover of the song.

The song is sampled heavily in Central Cee's 2022 single Let Go.

In popular culture
"Let Her Go" was used in a Budweiser commercial shown during Super Bowl XLVIII. It was used also in the season 7 finale of the Canadian Show Heartland as the send-off song and in "500 Years of Solitude",the 100th episode of The Vampire Diaries.

Bluegrass band The Travelin' McCourys recorded the song at Nashville studio the Butcher Shoppe, releasing the version on 13 January 2017.

Charts

Weekly charts

Year-end charts

Decade-end charts

All-time charts

Certifications

See also
 List of best-selling singles in Australia
 List of Billboard Adult Contemporary number ones of 2014

Release history

References

2012 singles
2012 songs
Passenger (singer) songs
Number-one singles in Austria
Number-one singles in Denmark
Number-one singles in Finland
Number-one singles in Germany
Number-one singles in Greece
Number-one singles in Norway
Number-one singles in Sweden
Number-one singles in Switzerland
Number-one singles in Belgium
Ultratop 50 Singles (Flanders) number-one singles
Irish Singles Chart number-one singles
Record Report Pop Rock General number-one singles
Rock ballads
Folk ballads
2010s ballads
Nettwerk Records singles